Minniti is a surname. Notable people with the surname include:

Marco Minniti (born 1956), Italian politician
Mario Minniti (1577–1640), Italian painter
Tito Minniti (1909–1935), Italian pilot

Italian-language surnames